Bembidion compressum is a species of ground beetle in the family Carabidae. It is found in Europe and Northern Asia (excluding China) and North America.

References

compressum
Articles created by Qbugbot
Beetles described in 1963
Beetles of Europe
Beetles of Asia
Beetles of North America